The 2022 San Diego Padres season was the 54th season of the San Diego Padres franchise. The Padres play their home games at Petco Park as members of Major League Baseball's National League West Division.

On December 2, 2021, Commissioner of Baseball Rob Manfred announced a lockout of players, following expiration of the collective bargaining agreement (CBA) between the league and the Major League Baseball Players Association (MLBPA). On March 10, 2022, the MLB and MLBPA agreed to a new collective bargaining agreement, thus ending the lockout. Opening Day was played on April 7. Although MLB previously announced that several series would be cancelled due to the lockout, the agreement provides for a 162-game season, with originally canceled games to be made up via doubleheaders.

On October 2, San Diego clinched their first wild card berth since the pandemic shortened 2020 season and their first in a full season since the 2006 season. They defeated the New York Mets in the Wild Card Series and the Los Angeles Dodgers in the Division Series. The Padres' 3–1 upset over the Dodgers, whose 111 wins in the regular season were the fourth most in MLB history and 22 more than San Diego's 89. The only time in league playoff history that a team defeated an opponent who was more than 22 wins better was in the 1906 World Series, when the 93-win Chicago White Sox defeated the 116-win Chicago Cubs. San Diego advanced to face Philadelphia Phillies in the National League Championship Series, the Padres' first championship series since 1998. However, they were defeated by the Phillies, losing in five games.

Offseason

Lockout 

The expiration of the league's collective bargaining agreement (CBA) with the Major League Baseball Players Association occurred on December 1, 2021 with no new agreement in place. As a result, the team owners voted unanimously to lockout the players stopping all free agency and trades. 

The parties came to an agreement on a new CBA on March 10, 2022.

Rule changes 
Pursuant to the new CBA, several new rules were instituted for the 2022 season. The National League adopted the designated hitter full-time, a draft lottery was implemented, the postseason will expand from ten teams to twelve, and advertising patches appeared on player uniforms and helmets for the first time.

Regular season

Season standings

National League West

National League Wild Card

Record vs. opponents

Game log

Regular season

 
|- style="background:#fbb;"
| 1 || April 7 || @ Diamondbacks || 2–4 || Mantiply (1–0) || Suárez (0–1) || — || 35,508 || 0–1 || L1
|- style="background:#bfb;"
| 2 || April 8 || @ Diamondbacks || 3–0 || Manaea (1–0) || Pérez (0–1) || Rogers (1) || 17,297 || 1–1 || W1
|- style="background:#bfb;"
| 3 || April 9 || @ Diamondbacks || 5–2 || Wilson (1–0) || Kennedy (0–1) || Rogers (2) || 19,504 || 2–1 || W2
|- style="background:#bfb;"
| 4 || April 10 || @ Diamondbacks || 10–5 || Adams (1–0) || Smith (0–1) || — || 19,089 || 3–1 || W3
|- style="background:#bfb;"
| 5 || April 11 || @ Giants || 4–2 || Wilson (2–0) || Rogers (0–1) || Rogers (3) || 23,279 || 4–1 || W4
|- style="background:#fbb;"
| 6 || April 12 || @ Giants || 2–13 || Cobb (1–0) || Darvish (0–1) || — || 25,560 || 4–2 || L1
|- style="background:#fbb;" 
| 7 || April 13 || @ Giants || 1–2 || Webb (1–0) || Manaea (1–1) || Doval (1) || 27,197 || 4–3 || L2
|- style="background:#bfb;" 
| 8 || April 14 || Braves || 12–1 || Musgrove (1–0) || Morton (1–1) || — || 44,844 || 5–3 || W1
|- style="background:#fbb;" 
| 9 || April 15 || Braves || 2–5 || O'Day (1–0) || Johnson (0–1) || Jansen (1) || 41,993 || 5–4 || L1
|- style="background:#fbb;" 
| 10 || April 16 || Braves || 2–5 || Anderson (1–1) || Martinez (0–1) || Jansen (2) || 36,924 || 5–5 || L2
|- style="background:#bfb;" 
| 11 || April 17 || Braves || 2–1 || Darvish (1–1) || Elder (1–1) || Rogers (4) || 37,694 || 6–5 || W1
|- style="background:#bfb;" 
| 12 || April 18 || Reds || 4–1 || Manaea (2–1) || Lodolo (0–2) || Rogers (5) || 31,121 || 7–5 || W2
|- style="background:#bfb;" 
| 13 || April 19 || Reds || 6–2 || Musgrove (2–0) || Sanmartin (0–2) || — || 31,313 || 8–5 || W3
|- style="background:#bfb;"
| 14 || April 20 || Reds || 6–0 || Gore (1–0) || Gutiérrez (0–3) || — || 29,359 || 9–5 || W4
|- style="background:#fbb;" 
| 15 || April 22 || Dodgers || 1–6 || Urías (1–1) || Martinez (0–2) || — || 44,482 || 9–6 || L1
|- style="background:#bfb;" 
| 16 || April 23 || Dodgers || 3–2  || Suárez (1–1) || Bruihl (0–1) || — || 44,444 || 10–6 || W1
|- style="background:#fbb;" 
| 17 || April 24 || Dodgers || 2–10 || Kershaw (3–0) || Manaea (2–2) || — || 44,930 || 10–7 || L1
|- style="background:#bfb;" 
| 18 || April 26 || @ Reds || 9–6 || Musgrove (3–0) || Sanmartin (0–3) || - || 10,056 || 11–7 || W1
|- style="background:#bfb;" 
| 19 || April 27 || @ Reds || 8–5 || Gore (2–0) || Gutiérrez (0–4) || Rogers (6) || 9,192 || 12–7 || W2
|- style="background:#bfb;" 
| 20 || April 28 || @ Reds || 7–5 || Martinez (1–2) || Mahle (1–3) || Rogers (7) || 10,449 || 13–7 || W3
|- style="background:#bfb;"  
| 21 || April 29 || @ Pirates || 7–3 || Darvish (2–1) || Thompson (0–3) || — || 9,755 || 14–7 || W4
|- style="background:#fbb;" 
| 22 || April 30 || @ Pirates || 6–7  || Stratton (1–1) || García (0–1) || — || 20,483 || 14–8 || L1
|-

|- style="background:#bfb;" 
| 23 || May 1 || @ Pirates || 5–2 || Musgrove (4–0) || Keller (0–4) || Rogers (9) || 8,350 || 15–8 || W1
|- style="background:#bbb;" 
| — || May 3 || @ Guardians || colspan=7| Postponed (rain); Makeup May 4
|- style="background:#bfb;" 
| 24 || May 4  || @ Guardians || 5–4 || Crismatt (1–0) || Plesac (1–3) || Rogers (10) ||  || 16–8 || W2
|- style="background:#fbb;" 
| 25 || May 4  || @ Guardians || 5–6  || Sandlin (2–1) || Lamet (0–1) || — || 10,244 || 16–9 || L1
|- style="background:#bfb;"
| 26 || May 5 || Marlins || 2–1 || Martinez (2–2) || Luzardo (2–2) || Rogers (11) || 31,034 || 17–9 || W1
|- style="background:#bfb;" 
| 27 || May 6 || Marlins || 3–2 || Darvish (3–1) || Alcántara (2–2) || Wilson (1) || 37,585 || 18–9 || W2
|- style="background:#fbb;" 
| 28 || May 7 || Marlins || 0–8 || López (4–1) || Manaea (2–3) || — || 34,709 || 18–10 || L1
|- style="background:#bfb;" 
| 29 || May 8 || Marlins || 3–2 || Suárez (2–1) || Sulser (0–1) || — || 37,937 || 19–10 || W1
|- style="background:#fbb;"
| 30 || May 9 || Cubs || 0–6 || Hendricks (2–3) || Gore (2–1) || — || 41,595 || 19–11 || L1
|- style="background:#bfb;" 
| 31 || May 10 || Cubs || 5–4 || Wilson (3–0) || Gsellman (0–1) || Rogers (12) || 31,047 || 20–11 || W1
|- style="background:#fbb;" 
| 32 || May 11 || Cubs || 5–7 || Givens (2–0) || García (0–2) || Wick (2) || 29,344 || 20–12 || L1
|- style="background:#bfb;" 
| 33 || May 13 || @ Braves || 11–6 || García (1–2) || Smith (0–1) || Rogers (13) || 40,635 || 21–12 || W1
|- style="background:#fbb;' 
| 34 || May 14 || @ Braves || 5–6 || Jansen (2–0) || Wilson (3–1) || — || 40,490 || 21–13 || L1
|- style="background:#bfb;"
| 35 || May 15 || @ Braves || 7–3  || Crismatt (2–0) || Stephens (0–1) || — || 40,114 || 22–13 || W1
|- style="background:#bfb;" 
| 36 || May 17 || @ Phillies || 3–0 || Clevinger (1–0) || Eflin (1–3) || Rogers (14) || 29,200 || 23–13 || W2
|- style="background:#fbb;" 
| 37 || May 18 || @ Phillies || 0–3 || Wheeler (2–3) || Snell (0–1) || Knebel (8) || 27,655 || 23–14 || L1
|- style="background:#bfb;"
| 38 || May 19 || @ Phillies || 2–0 || Darvish (4–1) || Gibson (3–2) || Rogers (15) || 30,146 || 24–14 || W1
|- style="background:#bfb;"
| 39 || May 20 || @ Giants || 8–7  || García (2–2) || Doval (0–2) || Suárez (1) || 31,359 || 25–14 || W2
|- style="background:#bfb;" 
| 40 || May 21 || @ Giants || 2–1 || Musgrove (5–0) || Rodón (4–3) || Rogers (16) || 38,916 || 26–14 || W3
|- style="background:#bfb;" 
| 41 || May 22 || @ Giants || 10–1 || Gore (3–1) || Wood (3–3) || — || 35,363 || 27–14 || W4
|- style="background:#bfb;" 
| 42 || May 23 || Brewers || 3–2  || García (3–2) || Sánchez (0–1) || — || 31,504 || 28–14 || W5
|- style="background:#fbb;"
| 43 || May 24 || Brewers || 1–4 || Burnes (2–2) || Snell (0–2) || Williams (3) || 39,834 || 28–15 || L1
|- style="background:#fbb;"
| 44 || May 25 || Brewers || 1–2 || Perdomo (1–0) || Darvish (4–2) || Williams (4) || 27,831 || 28–16 || L2
|- style="background:#bfb;" 
| 45 || May 27 || Pirates || 4–3 || Crismatt (3–0) || Underwood Jr. (0–1) || Rogers (17) || 41,888 || 29–16 || W1
|- style="background:#fbb;" 
| 46 || May 28 || Pirates || 2–4 || Banda (1–0) || Rogers (0–1) || Bednar (9) || 38,189 || 29–17 || L1
|- style="background:#bfb;" 
| 47 || May 29 || Pirates || 4–2  || García (4–2) || Stratton (2–2) || — || 44,395 || 30–17 || W1
|- style="background:#fbb;" 
| 48 || May 30 || @ Cardinals || 3–6 || Pallante (1–0) || Martinez (2–3) || — || 42,140 || 30–18 || L1
|- style="background:#fbb;" 
| 49 || May 31 || @ Cardinals || 2–3  || VerHagen (3–0) || Rogers (0–2) || — || 33,418 || 30–19 || L2
|-

|- style="background:#fbb;" 
| 50 || June 1 || @ Cardinals || 2–5 || Hudson (4–2) || Darvish (4–3) || Wittgren (1) || 34,268 || 30–20 || L3
|- style="background:#fbb;" 
| 51 || June 2 || @ Brewers || 4–5 || Strzelecki (1–0) || Rogers (0–3) || — || 21,451 || 30–21 || L4
|- style="background:#bfb;" 
| 52 || June 3 || @ Brewers || 7–0 || Musgrove (6–0) || Burnes (3–3) || — || 30,019 || 31–21 || W1
|- style="background:#bfb;" 
| 53 || June 4 || @ Brewers || 4–0 || Gore (4–1) || Ashby (1–4) || — || 37,376 || 32–21 || W2
|- style="background:#bfb;" 
| 54 || June 5 || @ Brewers || 6–4  || Hill (1–0) || Gott (1–1) || Rogers (18) || 32,285 || 33–21 || W3
|- style="background:#fbb;" 
| 55 || June 6 || Mets || 5–11 || Carrasco (7–1) || Snell (0–3) || — || 34,858 || 33–22 || L1
|- style="background:#bfb;"
| 56 || June 7 || Mets || 7–0 || Darvish (5–3) || Walker (3–2) || — || 31,796 || 34–22 || W1
|- style="background:#bfb;"
| 57 || June 8 || Mets || 13–2 || Manaea (3–3) || Bassitt (4–4) || — || 40,992 || 35–22 || W2
|- style="background:#bfb;"
| 58 || June 10 || Rockies || 9–0 || Musgrove (7–0) || Kuhl (4–3) || — || 35,207 || 36–22 || W3
|- style="background:#bfb;" 
| 59 || June 11  || Rockies || 2–1  || Wilson (4–1) || Estévez (1–4) || — || 31,415 || 37–22 || W4
|- style="background:#fbb;"
| 60 || June 11  || Rockies || 2–6 || Freeland (2–5) || Gore (4–2) || — || 30,040 || 37–23 || L1
|- style="background:#fbb;"
| 61 || June 12 || Rockies || 2–4 || Márquez (3–5) || García (4–3) || Bard (13) || 41,754 || 37–24 || L2
|- style="background:#bfb;"
| 62 || June 13 || @ Cubs || 4–1 || Darvish (6–3) || Wick (1–2) || Rogers (19) || 31,629 || 38–24 || W1
|- style="background:#bfb;"
| 63 || June 14 || @ Cubs || 12–5 || Tyler (1–0) || Effross (1–2) || — || 29,233 || 39–24 || W2
|- style="background:#bfb;" 
| 64 || June 15 || @ Cubs || 19–5 || Stammen (1–0) || Kilian (0–1) || — || 31,570 || 40–24 || W3
|- style="background:#bfb;"
| 65 || June 16 || @ Cubs || 6–4 || Musgrove (8–0) || Swarmer (1–2) || Rogers (20) || 30,096 || 41–24 || W4
|- style="background:#fbb;" 
| 66 || June 17 || @ Rockies || 4–10 || Freeland (3–5) || Gore (4–3) || — || 34,304 || 41–25 || L1
|- style="background:#fbb;" 
| 67 || June 18 || @ Rockies || 4–5 || Colomé (2–0) || García (4–4) || Bard (14) || 38,768 || 41–26 || L2
|- style="background:#fbb;" 
| 68 || June 19 || @ Rockies || 3–8 || Senzatela (3–3) || Snell (0–4) || — || 47,342 || 41–27 || L3
|- style="background:#bfb;" 
| 69 || June 20 || Diamondbacks || 4–1 || Darvish (7–3) || Davies (2–4) || Rogers (21) || 35,430 || 42–27 || W1
|- style="background:#bfb;" 
| 70 || June 21 || Diamondbacks || 3–2  || Hill (2–0) || Kennedy (3–4) || — || 31,528 || 43–27 || W2
|- style="background:#bfb;" 
| 71 || June 22 || Diamondbacks || 10–4 || Morejón (1–0) || Bumgarner (3–7) || Martinez (1) || 31,024 || 44–27 || W3
|- style="background:#fbb;" 
| 72 || June 23 || Phillies || 2–6 || Suárez (6–4) || Musgrove (8–1) || — || 40,355 || 44–27 || L1
|- style="background:#bfb;" 
| 73 || June 24 || Phillies || 1–0 || Crismatt (4–0) || Nola (4–5) || Rogers (22) || 38,890 || 45–28 || W1
|- style="background:#fbb;"
| 74 || June 25 || Phillies || 2–4 || Eflin (3–5) || Snell (0–5) || Domínguez (2) || 37,467 || 45–29 || L1
|- style="background:#fbb;" 
| 75 || June 26 || Phillies || 5–8 || Nelson (2–1) || Crismatt (4–1)|| Bellatti (1) || 41,620 || 45–30 || L2
|- style="background:#fbb;" 
| 76 || June 28 || @ Diamondbacks || 6–7 || Melancon (3–6) || Rogers (0–4) || — || 19,904 || 45–31 || L3
|- style="background:#bfb;" 
| 77 || June 29 || @ Diamondbacks || 4–0 || Clevinger (2–0) || Bumgarner (3–8) || Martinez (2) || 20,109 || 46–31 || W1
|- style="background:#fbb;"
| 78 || June 30 || @ Dodgers || 1–3 || Phillips (2–3) || Musgrove (8–2) || Kimbrel (14) || 53,094 || 46–32 || L1
|-

|- style="background:#fbb;" 
| 79 || July 1 || @ Dodgers || 1–5 || Gonsolin (10–0) || Stammen (1–1) || — || 48,076 || 46–33 || L2
|- style="background:#fbb;" 
| 80 || July 2 || @ Dodgers || 2–7 || Anderson (9–1) || Darvish (7–4) || — || 47,061 || 46–34 || L3
|- style="background:#bfb;" 
| 81 || July 3 || @ Dodgers || 4–2 || Martinez (3–3) || Kimbrel (1–4) || Rogers (23) || 42,633 || 47–34 || W1
|- style="background:#fbb;" 
| 82 || July 4 || Mariners || 2–8 || Flexen (5–8) || Manaea (3–4) || — || 37,913 || 47–35 || L1
|- style="background:#fbb;" 
| 83 || July 5 || Mariners || 2–6 || Gilbert (10–3) || Clevinger (2–1) || — || 29,745 || 47–36 || L2
|- style="background:#bfb;"
| 84 || July 7 || Giants || 2–1  || Crismatt (5–1) || García (1–3) || — || 42,656 || 48–36 || W1
|- style="background:#bfb;"
| 85 || July 8 || Giants || 6–3 || Snell (1–5) || Long (0–2) || Martinez (3) || 42,861 || 49–36 || W2
|- style="background:#fbb;"
| 86 || July 9 || Giants || 1–3 || Rodón (8–5) || García (4–5) || — || 41,714 || 49–37 || L1
|- style="background:#fbb;"
| 87 || July 10 || Giants || 0–12 || Wood (6–7) || Gore (4–4) || — || 38,712 || 49–38 || L2
|- style="background:#bfb;"
| 88 || July 11 || @ Rockies || 6–5 || Manaea (4–4) || Ureña (0–1) || Rogers (24) || 27,592 || 50–38 || W1
|- style="background:#fbb;"
| 89 || July 12 || @ Rockies || 3–5 || Gomber (5–7) || Clevinger (2–2) || Bard (19) || 26,577 || 50–39 || L1
|- style="background:#fbb;"
| 90 || July 13 || @ Rockies || 6–10 || Stephenson (1–1) || Scott (0–1) || — || 25,725 || 50–40 || L2
|- style="background:#fbb;" 
| 91 || July 14 || @ Rockies || 5–8 || Chacín (4–2) || Crismatt (5–2) || Estévez (1) || 28,077 || 50–41 || L3
|- style="background:#bfb;"
| 92 || July 15 || Diamondbacks || 5–3 || Darvish (8–4) || Bumgarner (5–9) || Rogers (25) || 41,302 || 51–41 || W1
|- style="background:#bfb;"
| 93 || July 16 || Diamondbacks || 4–3 || Manaea (5–4) || Ramirez (2–3) || Rogers (26) || 42,384 || 52–41 || W2
|- style="background:#fbb;"
| 94 || July 17 || Diamondbacks || 1–3 || Kelly (9–5) || Clevinger (2–3) || Melancon (13) || 36,428 || 52–42 || L1
|-style="text-align:center; background:#bbcaff;"
| colspan="10"|92nd All-Star Game in Los Angeles, CA
|- style="background:#bfb;'
| 95 || July 22 || @ Mets || 4–1 || Darvish (9–4) || Scherzer (6–2) || Rogers (27) || 36,855 || 53–42 || W1
|- style="background:#bfb;"
| 96 || July 23 || @ Mets || 2–1 || Snell (2–5) || Bassitt (7–7) || Rogers (28) || 39,359 || 54–42 || W2
|- style="background:#fbb;"
| 97 || July 24 || @ Mets || 5–8 || Smith (2–3) || Musgrove (8–3) || Díaz (21) || 35,475 || 54–43 || L1
|- style="background:#fbb;" 
| 98 || July 25 || @ Tigers || 4–12 || Vest (2–2) || Manaea (5–5) || — || 21,647 || 54–44 || L2
|- style="background:#bfb;" 
| 99 || July 26 || @ Tigers || 6–4  || Rogers (1–4) || Soto (2–5) || Martinez (4) || 24,213 || 55–44 || W1
|- style="background:#fbb;"
| 100 || July 27 || @ Tigers || 3–4 || Fulmer (3–4) || Rogers (1–5) || — || 24,669 || 55–45 || L1
|- style="background:#bfb;"
| 101 || July 29 || Twins || 10–1 || Snell (3–5) || Ryan (7–4) || — || 43,171 || 56–45 || W1
|- style="background:#fbb;"
| 102 || July 30 || Twins || 4–7 || Gray (6–3) || Musgrove (8–4) || — || 39,574 || 56–46 || L1
|- style="background:#bfb;"
| 103 || July 31 || Twins || 3–2 || Manaea (6–5) || Bundy (6–5) || García (1) || 37,336 || 57–46 || W1
|-

|- style="background:#bfb;"
| 104 || August 1 || Rockies || 4–1 || Clevinger (3–3) || Senzatela (3–6) || García (2) || 29,983 || 58–46 || W2
|- style="background:#bfb;" 
| 105 || August 2  || Rockies || 13–5 || Darvish (10–4) || Bird (1–3) || — || 23,828 || 59–46 || W3
|- style="background:#bfb;"
| 106 || August 2  || Rockies || 3–2 || Hader (2–4) || Colomé (2–4) || — || 30,759 || 60–46 || W4
|- style="background:#bfb;"
| 107 || August 3 || Rockies || 9–1 || Snell (4–5) || Kuhl (6–7) || — || 44,652 || 61–46 || W5
|- style="background:#fbb;"
| 108 || August 4 || Rockies || 3–7 || Freeland (7–7) || Musgrove (8–5) || — || 30,366 || 61–47 || L1
|- style="background:#fbb;"
| 109 || August 5 || @ Dodgers || 1–8 || Gonsolin (13–1) || Manaea (6–6) || — || 52,714 || 61–48 || L2
|- style="background:#fbb;"
| 110 || August 6 || @ Dodgers || 3–8 || Martin (3–0) || Clevinger (3–4) || — || 52,124 || 61–49 || L3
|- style="background:#fbb;"
| 111 || August 7 || @ Dodgers || 0–4 || Anderson (13–1) || Darvish (10–5) || — || 48,093 || 61–50 || L4
|- style="background:#fbb;" 
| 112 || August 8 || Giants || 0–1 || Wood (8–9) || Snell (4–6) || Doval (15) || 40,686 || 61–51 || L5
|- style="background:#bfb;" 
| 113 || August 9 || Giants || 7–4 || Hill (3–0) || Rogers (2–4) || — || 38,626 || 62–51 || W1
|- style="background:#bfb;"
| 114 || August 10 || Giants || 13–7 || Suárez (3–1) || Marte (0–1) || — || 32,834 || 63–51 || W2
|- style="background:#bfb;"
| 115 || August 12 || @ Nationals || 10–5 || Clevinger (4–4) || Abbott (0–2) || — || 35,390 || 64–51 || W3
|- style="background:#fbb;"
| 116 || August 13 || @ Nationals || 3–4 || Finnegan (4–2) || Darvish (10–6) || Edwards Jr. (2) || 33,661 || 64–52 || L1
|- style="background:#bfb;"
| 117 || August 14 || @ Nationals || 6–0 || Snell (5–6) || Espino (0–5) || — || 27,498 || 65–52 || W1
|- style="background:#fbb;" 
| 118 || August 15 || @ Marlins || 0–3 || Alcántara (11–5) || Musgrove (8–6) || Scott (17) || 9,123 || 65–53 || L1
|- style="background:#fbb;"
| 119 || August 16 || @ Marlins || 3–4 || Hernández (3–6) || García (4–6) || Floro (3) || 9,065 || 65–54 || L2
|- style="background:#bfb;"
| 120 || August 17 || @ Marlins || 10–3 || Morejón (2–0) || López (7–8) || — || 7,273 || 66–54 || W1
|- style="background:#fbb;"
| 121 || August 18 || Nationals || 1–3 || Edwards Jr. (5–3) || Darvish (10–7) || Finnegan (6) || 41,820 || 66–55 || L1
|- style="background:#fbb;"
| 122 || August 19 || Nationals || 3–6 || Ramírez (4–1) || Hader (2–5) || Finnegan (7) || 39,474 || 66–56 || L2
|- style="background:#bfb;" 
| 123 || August 20 || Nationals || 2–1 || Morejón (3–0) || Cishek (1–4) || García (3) || 42,529 || 67–56 || W1
|- style="background:#bfb;"
| 124 || August 21 || Nationals || 2–1 || Manaea (7–6) || Corbin (4–17) || Martinez (5) || 38,253 || 68–56 || W1
|- style="background:#fbb;"
| 125 || August 23 || Guardians || 1–3 || Sandlin (5–2) || Clevinger (4–5) || Clase (29) || 38,166 || 68–57 || L1
|- style="background:#fbb;"
| 126 || August 24 || Guardians || 0–7 || Quantrill (10–5) || Snell (5–7) || — || 30,409 || 68–58 || L2
|- style="background:#bfb;"
| 127 || August 26 || @ Royals || 13–5 || Suárez (4–1) || Bubic (2–9) || — || 16,479 || 69–58 || W1
|- style="background:#bfb;"
| 128 || August 27 || @ Royals || 4–3 || Darvish (11–7) || Lynch (4–9) || Martinez (6) || 22,232 || 70–58 || W2
|- style="background:#fbb;"
| 129 || August 28 || @ Royals || 7–15 || Heasley (2–7) || Manaea (7–7) || — || 12,584 || 70–59 || L1
|- style="background:#bfb;"
| 130 || August 29 || @ Giants || 6–5 || Clevinger (5–5) || Rodón (12–7) || Martinez (7) || 24,815 || 71–59 || W1
|- style="background:#bfb;"
| 131 || August 30 || @ Giants || 4–3 || Snell (6–7) || Webb (11–8) || Martinez (8) || 28,267 || 72–59 || W2
|- style="background:#bfb;"
| 132 || August 31 || @ Giants || 5–4 || Musgrove (9–6) || Wood (8–12) || Hader (30) || 25,298 || 73–59 || W3
|-

|- style="background:#bfb;"
| 133 || September 2 || @ Dodgers || 7–1 || Darvish (12–7) || May (1–2) || — || 45,164 || 74–59 || W4
|- style="background:#fbb;" 
| 134 || September 3 || @ Dodgers || 1–12 || Urías (15–7) || Manaea (7–8) || — || 46,144 || 74–60 || L1
|- style="background:#fbb;" 
| 135 || September 4 || @ Dodgers || 4–9 || Vesia (4–0) || Clevinger (5–6) || — || 48,522 || 74–61 || L2
|- style="background:#fbb;"
| 136 || September 5 || Diamondbacks || 0–5 || Nelson (1–0) || Snell (6–8) || — || 37,713 || 74–62 || L3
|- style="background:#bfb;"
| 137 || September 6 || Diamondbacks || 6–5 || Martinez (4–3) || Kennedy (4–7) || — || 31,308 || 75–62 || W1
|- style="background:#bfb;" 
| 138 || September 7 || Diamondbacks || 6–3 || Darvish (13–7) || Henry (3–4) || Hader (31) || 36,948 || 76–62 || W2
|- style="background:#bfb;"
| 139 || September 9 || Dodgers || 5–4  || Morejón (4–0) || Hembree (3–1) || — || 43,286 || 77–62 || W3
|- style="background:#fbb;"
| 140 || September 10 || Dodgers || 4–8 || Urías (16–7) || Snell (6–9) || — || 43,639 || 77–63 || L1
|- style="background:#fbb;"
| 141 || September 11 || Dodgers || 2–11 || Heaney (3–2) || Musgrove (9–7) || — || 41,652 || 77–64 || L2
|- style="background:#bfb;"
| 142 || September 13 || @ Mariners || 2–0 || Darvish (14–7) || Gilbert (12–6) || Hader (32) || 34,740 || 78–64 || W1
|- style="background:#fbb;" 
| 143 || September 14 || @ Mariners || 1–6 || Castillo (7–5) || Clevinger (5–7) || — || 24,238 || 78–65 || L1
|- style="background:#fbb;" 
| 144 || September 15 || @ Diamondbacks || 0–4 || Jameson (1–0) || Manaea (7–9) || — || 17,121 || 78–66 || L2
|- style="background:#bfb;" 
| 145 || September 16 || @ Diamondbacks || 12–3 || Snell (7–9) || Bumgarner (6–15) || — || 19,945 || 79–66 || W1
|- style="background:#bfb;" 
| 146 || September 17 || @ Diamondbacks || 2–0 || Musgrove (10–7) || Gallen (12–3) || Hader (33) || 29,796 || 80–66 || W2
|- style="background:#bfb;" 
| 147 || September 18 || @ Diamondbacks || 6–1 || Darvish (15–7) || Nelson (1–1) || — || 20,480 || 81–66 || W3
|- style="background:#bfb;" 
| 148 || September 20 || Cardinals || 5–0 || Clevinger (6–7) || Wainwright (11–10) || — || 39,538 || 82–66 || W4
|- style="background:#bfb;" 
| 149 || September 21 || Cardinals || 1–0 || Snell (8–9) || Mikolas (11–13) || Hader (34) || 38,643 || 83–66 || W5
|- style="background:#fbb;" 
| 150 || September 22 || Cardinals || 4–5 || Flaherty (1–1) || Martinez (4–4) || Gallegos (14) || 33,389 || 83–67 || L1
|- style="background:#fbb;" 
| 151 || September 23 || @ Rockies || 3–4  || Bard (6–4) || Morejón (4–1) || — || 48,321 || 83–68 || L2
|- style="background:#bfb;"
| 152 || September 24 || @ Rockies || 9–3 || Darvish (16–7) || Kuhl (6–10) || — || 45,983 || 84–68 || W1
|- style="background:#bfb;"
| 153 || September 25 || @ Rockies || 13–6 || Suárez (5–1) || Freeland (9–11) || — || 40,503 || 85–68 || W2
|- style="background:#bfb;" 
| 154 || September 27 || Dodgers || 4–3  || Johnson (1–1) || Kimbrel (6–7) || — || 32,127 || 86–68 || W3
|- style="background:#fbb;" 
| 155 || September 28 || Dodgers || 0–1  || Vesia (5–0) || Wilson (4–2) || Kahnle (1) || 32,523 || 86–69 || L1
|- style="background:#fbb;"
| 156 || September 29 || Dodgers || 2–5 || Heaney (4–3) || Johnson (1–2) || Price (2) || 35,636 || 86–70 || L2
|- style="background:#fbb;"
| 157 || September 30 || White Sox || 1–3 || Martin (3–5) || Darvish (16–8) || Hendriks (35) || 37,490 || 86–71 || L3
|-

|- style="background:#bfb;"  
| 158 || October 1 || White Sox || 5–2 || Clevinger (7–7) || Cease (14–8) || Hader (35) || 38,114 || 87–71 || W1
|- style="background:#fbb;"
| 159 || October 2 || White Sox || 1–2 || Lynn (8–7) || Snell (8–10) || Hendriks (36) || 41,407 || 87–72 || L1
|- style="background:#bfb;"
| 160 || October 3 || Giants || 7–4 || Morejón (5–1) || Miller (0–1) || Hader (36) || 31,687 || 88–72 || W1
|- style="background:#bfb;"
| 161 || October 4 || Giants || 6–2 || Manaea (8–9) || Cobb (7–8) || — || 32,884 || 89–72 || W2
|- style="background:#fbb;" 
| 162 || October 5 || Giants || 1–8 || Marte (1–1) || Stammen (1–2) || — || 32,064 || 89–73 || L1
|-

|- style="text-align:center;"
| Legend:       = Win       = Loss       = PostponementBold = Padres team member

Postseason

Game log

|- style="background:#bfb;"
| 1 || October 7 || @ Mets || 7–1 || Darvish (1–0) || Scherzer (0–1) || — || 41,621 || 1–0
|- style="background:#fbb;"
| 2 || October 8 || @ Mets || 3–7 || deGrom (1–0) || Martinez (0–1) || Lugo (1) || 42,156 || 1–1
|- style="background:#bfb;"
| 3 || October 9 || @ Mets || 6–0 || Musgrove (1–0) || Bassitt (0–1) || — || 39,241 || 2–1
|-

|- style="background:#fbb;"
| 1 || October 11 || @ Dodgers || 3–5 || Urías (1–0) || Clevinger (0–1) || Martin (1) || 52,407 || 0–1
|- style="background:#bfb;"
| 2 || October 12 || @ Dodgers || 5–3 || Darvish (1–0) || Graterol (0–1) || Hader (1) || 53,122 || 1–1
|- style="background:#bfb;"
| 3 || October 14 || Dodgers || 2–1 || Snell (1–0) || Gonsolin (0–1) || Hader (2) || 45,137 || 2–1
|- style="background:#bfb;"
| 4 || October 15 || Dodgers || 5–3 || Hill (1–0) || Almonte (0–1) || Hader (3) || 45,139 || 3–1
|-

|- style="background:#fbb;"
| 1 || October 18 || Phillies || 0–2 || Wheeler (1–1) || Darvish (2–1) || Alvarado (1) || 44,826 || 0–1
|- style="background:#bfb;"
| 2 || October 19 || Phillies || 8–5 || Snell (2–0) || Nola (2–1) || Hader (4) || 44,607 || 1–1
|- style="background:#fbb;"
| 3 || October 21 || @ Phillies || 2–4 || Suárez (1–0) || Musgrove (1–1) || Domínguez (1) || 45,279 || 1–2
|- style="background:#fbb;" 
| 4 || October 22 || @ Phillies || 6–10 || Hand (2–0) || Manaea (0–1) || — || 45,467 || 1–3
|- style="background:#fbb;"
| 5 || October 23 || @ Phillies || 3–4 || Alvarado (1–0) || Suárez (0–1) || Suárez (1) || 45,485 || 1-4
|-

Postseason rosters

| style="text-align:left" |
Pitchers: 4 Blake Snell 11 Yu Darvish 21 Nick Martinez 25 Tim Hill 36 Pierce Johnson 44 Joe Musgrove 48 Steven Wilson 50 Adrián Morejón 55 Sean Manaea 66 Luis García 71 Josh Hader 75 Robert Suárez 
Catchers: 12 Luis Campusano 26 Austin Nola 38 Jorge Alfaro 
Infielders: 5 Wil Myers 7 Ha-seong Kim 9 Jake Cronenworth 13 Manny Machado 16 Brandon Dixon 17 Brandon Drury 
Outfielders: 2 Trent Grisham 10 Jurickson Profar 22 Juan Soto 28 José Azócar
Designated hitters: 24 Josh Bell 
|- valign="top"

| style="text-align:left" |
Pitchers: 4 Blake Snell 11 Yu Darvish 21 Nick Martinez 25 Tim Hill 36 Pierce Johnson 44 Joe Musgrove 48 Steven Wilson 50 Adrián Morejón 52 Mike Clevinger 55 Sean Manaea 66 Luis García 71 Josh Hader 75 Robert Suárez 
Catchers: 12 Luis Campusano 26 Austin Nola 38 Jorge Alfaro 
Infielders: 5 Wil Myers 7 Ha-seong Kim 9 Jake Cronenworth 13 Manny Machado 17 Brandon Drury 
Outfielders: 2 Trent Grisham 10 Jurickson Profar 22 Juan Soto 28 José Azócar
Designated hitters: 24 Josh Bell 
|- valign="top"

| style="text-align:left" |
Pitchers: 4 Blake Snell 11 Yu Darvish 21 Nick Martinez 25 Tim Hill 36 Pierce Johnson 44 Joe Musgrove 48 Steven Wilson 50 Adrián Morejón 52 Mike Clevinger 55 Sean Manaea 66 Luis García 71 Josh Hader 75 Robert Suárez
Catchers: 12 Luis Campusano 26 Austin Nola 38 Jorge Alfaro
Infielders: 5 Wil Myers 7 Ha-seong Kim 9 Jake Cronenworth 13 Manny Machado 17 Brandon Drury
Outfielders: 2 Trent Grisham 10 Jurickson Profar 22 Juan Soto 28 José Azócar
Designated hitters: 24 Josh Bell 
|- valign="top"

Roster

Farm system

Notes

References

External links 
 San Diego Padres official site
 2022 San Diego Padres at Baseball-Reference.com

San Diego Padres seasons
San Diego Padres
San Diego Padres